NCAA Season 84 is the 2008–09 season of the National Collegiate Athletic Association of the Philippines.

Mapua Institute of Technology is the host of the 2008–2009 season, with the year's theme being "To The Fore at 84: Building Bridges Through Sports". NCAA Season 81's commissioner Joe Lipa returns as a commissioner.

Unresolved issues from Season 83

PCU suspension
After being suspended the previous season for identity switching, an additional five student-athletes were implicated by the NCAA's own investigation to the matter. Initially, it was thought that the Management Committee (MANCOM) would extend PCU's suspension for another year.

On May 28, the Policy Board and the PCU management announced an agreement in which the PCU Dolphins seniors' teams would return to the league for Season 84, with the juniors' teams still suspended; after the season, the school would take an indefinite leave of absence from the league. As a result, the Policy Board scrapped the MANCOM's earlier recommendation of extending the suspension for another year with three years of probation thereafter. Several players were also banned from the league, with the exception of Elvin Pascual who is currently at the San Beda Red Lions' team B; his status would be decided on the eligibility meeting on June 10. Pascual was cleared to play by the MANCOM after an appeal was granted on a previous decision that barred him from playing.

Game-fixing allegations
Another issue being investigated by the MANCOM were the allegations of game-fixing on games, especially after Paolo Orbeta of CSB was implicated on point shaving. Incoming president Dr. Reynaldo Vea of Season 84 host Mapua and his predecessor Dr. Vince Fabella of Jose Rizal issued a stern warning on the matter.

Return of the Mapua juniors team
The Mapua juniors team returns with student-athletes from the Malayan High School of Science; the original Mapua Institute of Technology Pre-Engineering High School closed down after the Yuchengco takeover of the institute. The school was "forced" to form the team for them to be able to host the season since they will not be allowed to take part in seniors' events, which would jeopardize their hosting duties. The basketball team would be handled by former Mapua Cardinals Randy Alcantara and Chito Victolero. The old Mapua juniors team held the most basketball championships, with 18.

PBA Draft rules
After Yousif Aljamal's suspension the previous season that led into court intervention, the league clarified its rules on application to the Philippine Basketball Association (PBA) Draft; the applicant must formally inform the league on their intentions to apply. Also the league implemented another rule restricting a member school from fielding more than two imports at the same time to level the playing field following the entry of foreign players.

Basketball

Seniors' tournament

Elimination round

Bracket

Juniors' tournament

Elimination round

Bracket

Volleyball
Host team in boldface.

Men's tournament

Women's tournament

Juniors' tournament

Soccer
Host team in boldface.

Seniors' tournament

Juniors' tournament

Beach Volleyball

Men's final

Women's final

Juniors' final

Chess

Seniors' tournament

Elimination round

Juniors' tournament

Elimination round

Taekwondo
Host team in boldface.

Seniors' tournament

Juniors' tournament

Lawn tennis
Host team in boldface.

Seniors' tournament

Juniors' tournament

Table tennis
Host team in boldface.

Men's tournament

Women's tournament

Juniors' tournament

Swimming
Host team in boldface.

Seniors' tournament

Juniors' tournament

Track and field
Host team in boldface.

Seniors' tournament

Juniors' tournament

General Championship race

Seniors' Division

Juniors' Division

See also
UAAP Season 71

References

External links
NCAA official website

2008 in Philippine sport
2008 in multi-sport events
84
2009 in Philippine sport
2009 in multi-sport events